Sex and the City: Music from the HBO Series is the soundtrack to the HBO series Sex and the City. It was released on June 6, 2000, by Sire Records.

Track listing
"Sexbomb" (Peppermint Jam Remix) – Tom Jones with Mousse T
"Taste the Tears" – Amber
"Righteous Love" – Joan Osborne
"Love TKO" – Bette Midler
"Count to 10" – Imani Coppola
"More, More, More" – The Dust Brothers
"Hot Boyz" – Missy "Misdemeanor" Elliott
"Got the Girl" – Reiss
"The Time Is Now" – Moloko
"Calling It Quits" – Aimee Mann
"Dreams Come True" – Elan Atias
"For Only You" – Trisha Yearwood
"Sex and the City Theme" – Groove Armada

References

2000 soundtrack albums
Sex and the City
Sire Records soundtracks
Television soundtracks